The 1987 National Invitation Tournament was the 1987 edition of the annual NCAA college basketball competition.  The tournament began on Wednesday, March 11, and ended when the Southern Miss Golden Eagles defeated the La Salle Explorers in the NIT championship game on Thursday, March 26, at Madison Square Garden.

Selected teams
Below is a list of the 32 teams selected for the tournament.

Louisville declines invitation

Louisville turned down an invitation to the 1987 NIT, the first team in history to decline an NIT bid. No team would do so again until Georgetown in 2002.

Bracket
Below are the four first round brackets, along with the four-team championship bracket.

Semifinals & finals

See also
 1987 National Women's Invitational Tournament
 1987 NCAA Division I men's basketball tournament
 1987 NCAA Division II men's basketball tournament
 1987 NCAA Division III men's basketball tournament
 1987 NCAA Division I women's basketball tournament
 1987 NCAA Division II women's basketball tournament
 1987 NCAA Division III women's basketball tournament
 1987 NAIA Division I men's basketball tournament
 1987 NAIA Division I women's basketball tournament

References

National Invitation
National Invitation Tournament
1980s in Manhattan
Basketball in New York City
College sports in New York City
Madison Square Garden
National Invitation Tournament
National Invitation Tournament
Sports competitions in New York City
Sports in Manhattan